The vennels of Perth are a collection of small medieval streets in the city of Perth, Scotland.Lanes and Vennels of Perth – PerthCity.co.uk Similar to York's Snickelways, vennels are a public right-of-way passageway between the gables of buildings which can, in effect, be a minor street. In Scotland, the term originated in royal burghs created in the twelfth century, the word deriving from the Old French word venelle meaning "alley" or "lane". Unlike a tenement entry to private property, known as a "close", a vennel was a public way leading from a typical high street to the open ground beyond the burgage plots. The Latin form is venella, related to the English word "funnel". 

Perth developed from an initial plan of two parallel streets — High Street and South Street — linked by several vennels leading north and south. The names of these vennels have historic origins, and many — such as Cow Vennel and Fleshers Vennel — reflect the trades associated with their foundation. South Street was originally terminated at its eastern end by Gowrie House (the site of today's Perth Sheriff Court). Upon its demolition in the early 19th century, direct access was granted to the river.

In 2018, Perth architect Fergus Purdie put forward a design to revamp a space off of Guard Vennel. If it were to be accepted, it would become a temporary events space. The plan was approved, on a city-wide scale, in March 2019.

List of Perth's vennels

Below is a list of Perth's vennels (and the streets they connect).

Baxters Vennel (St John's Place to Watergate) – Baxter is the old Scots name for baker
Burt's Vennels
Cow Vennel (Mill Street to High Street) (Canal Street to South Street) – so named because it is where people would drive their cattle onto the South Inch for grazing
Cutlog Vennel (Mill Street to 189 High Street)
Fleshers' Vennel (St John's Place to 49 South Street; bounds St John's Kirk to the west)
Guard Vennel (Mill Street to 105 High Street)
Horners Lane (South Street to Canal Street)
Lochee Vennel
Meal Vennel (South Street to 164 High Street). Described in 1907 as "an old thoroughfare, presently the resort of curio dealers, and the happy hunting-ground of collectors". Several labourers lived on the street in 1911. It was also the home of the Central District School
Oliphants Vennel (44 St John Street to Watergate)
Ritten Row – one of the Kirk vennels
Ropemakers Close (South Street to Canal Street)
Salt Vennel – one of the Kirk vennels
School Vennel
Water Vennel (Tay Street to 83 Watergate)
Weaver Vennel (from and to South Street)

References

Bibliography
Perth: Street by Street: A Geographical and Historical Tour Around Perth's 600-plus Streets, Roads, and Vennels, Paul Philippou

External links
Medieval Walk – Perth & Kinross Museums & Galleries
A Short History of the Watergate – Made in Perth

Buildings and structures in Perth, Scotland
Streets in Perth, Scotland
15th-century establishments in Scotland
History of Perth, Scotland